Phil Hoskins (born January 2, 1997) is an American football defensive tackle who is a free agent. He played college football at Kentucky and was drafted by the Panthers in the seventh round, 232nd overall, in the 2021 NFL Draft.

Professional career

Carolina Panthers
Hoskins was drafted by the Carolina Panthers in the seventh round, 232nd overall, of the 2021 NFL Draft. He signed his four-year rookie contract on May 13, 2021. On November 27, 2021, Hoskins was placed on the Panthers COVID-19 reserve list with three others.

On October 22, 2022, Hoskins was waived by the Panthers and re-signed to the practice squad.

Kansas City Chiefs
On January 12, 2023, Hoskins was signed to the Kansas City Chiefs practice squad. Hoskins won his first Super Bowl ring when the Chiefs defeated the Philadelphia Eagles in Super Bowl LVII.

References

External links
Kentucky Wildcats bio

Further reading

1997 births
Living people
Sportspeople from Toledo, Ohio
Players of American football from Ohio
American football defensive tackles
Kentucky Wildcats football players
Carolina Panthers players
Kansas City Chiefs players